1229 Tilia  is a dark Themistian asteroid from the outermost regions of the asteroid belt, approximately 28 kilometers in diameter. It was discovered on 9 October 1931, by astronomer Karl Reinmuth at the Heidelberg Observatory in southwest Germany, and given the provisional designation . The asteroid was named for the genus of trees, Tilia (lime tree, linden, basswood).

Orbit and classification 

Tilia belongs to the Themis family, a very large family of carbonaceous asteroids, named after 24 Themis. It orbits the Sun in the outermost asteroid belt at a distance of 2.7–3.8 AU once every 5 years and 9 months (2,115 days; semi-major axis of 3.22 AU). Its orbit has an eccentricity of 0.17 and an inclination of 1° with respect to the ecliptic.

The body's observation arc begins with a precovery taken at Lowell Observatory on 7 October 1931, or two days prior to its official discovery observation at Heidelberg.

Physical characteristics 

The asteroid's spectral type is unknown. Members of the Themis family are typically C-type asteroids. Tilias albedo (see below) agrees with this spectral type.

Diameter and albedo 

According to the survey carried out by the NEOWISE mission of NASA's Wide-field Infrared Survey Explorer, Tilia measures 27.795 kilometers in diameter and its surface has an albedo of 0.069.

Rotation period 

As of 2018, no rotational lightcurve of Tilia has been obtained from photometric observations. The asteroid's rotation period, spin axis and shape remain unknown.

Naming 

This minor planet was named after, Tilia – commonly known as lime tree, linden, or basswood – a genus of trees in the family Tiliaceae. The official naming citation was mentioned in The Names of the Minor Planets by Paul Herget in 1955.

Meta-naming 

The initials of the minor planets  through , all discovered by Reinmuth, spell out "G. Stracke". Gustav Stracke was a German astronomer and orbit computer, who had asked that no planet be named after him. In this manner Reinmuth was able to honour the man whilst honoring his wish. Nevertheless, Reinmuth directly honored Stracke by naming planet  later on. The astronomer Brian Marsden was honored by the same type of meta-naming using consecutive initial letters in 1995, spelling out "Brian M." in the sequence of minor planets  through .

Reinmuth's flowers 

Due to his many discoveries, Karl Reinmuth submitted a large list of 66 newly named asteroids in the early 1930s. This list also contained a sequence of 28 asteroids, starting with 1054 Forsytia, that were all named after plants, in particular flowering plants (also see list of minor planets named after animals and plants).

References

External links 
 Asteroid Lightcurve Database (LCDB), query form (info )
 Dictionary of Minor Planet Names, Google books
 Asteroids and comets rotation curves, CdR – Observatoire de Genève, Raoul Behrend
 Discovery Circumstances: Numbered Minor Planets (1)-(5000) – Minor Planet Center
 
 

001229
Discoveries by Karl Wilhelm Reinmuth
Named minor planets
19311009